Västerhejde is a locality on the Swedish island of Gotland. 

Västerhejde is also the name of the larger populated area, socken (not to be confused with parish). It comprises the same area as the administrative Västerhejde District, established on 1January 2016.

Geography 
Västerhejde is the name of the locality surrounding the medieval Västerhejde Church, sometimes referred to as Västerhejde kyrkby. It is also the name of the socken as well as the district. Västerhejde is located along the coast in the mid-west part of Gotland. , Västerhejde Church belongs to Stenkumla parish, along with the churches in Stenkumla, Träkumla and
Vibble.

Located within Västerhejde socken are Vibble, Bjärs, Nygårds fishing village with an adjacent manor and sheep farm, as well as Högklint, a small settlement by the coast. Högklint is also the name of the high cliff with an almost vertical  drop down to the sea. There are several small caves in the steep cliff side.

One of the asteroids in the asteroid belt, 10554 Västerhejde, is named after this place.

References

External links 

Objects from Västerhejde at the Digital Museum by Nordic Museum

Populated places in Gotland County